Rhodococcus phenolicus is a bacterium species in the genus Rhodococcus. Phenolicus comes from New Latin noun phenol -olis, phenol; Latin masculine gender suff. -icus, suffix used in adjectives with the sense of belonging to; New Latin masculine gender adjective phenolicus, belonging to phenol.
This species is able to degrade phenol as sole carbon source.

References

External links 

Type strain of Rhodococcus phenolicus at BacDive -  the Bacterial Diversity Metadatabase

Mycobacteriales
Bacteria described in 2006